Buraki (also Romanized as Būrakī; also known as Būrak-e Bālā, Būrak-e Dāman, and Būrakī-ye Bālā) is a village in Tasuj Rural District, in the Central District of Kavar County, Fars Province, Iran. At the 2006 census, its population was 500, in 102 families.

References 

Populated places in Kavar County